Night Fairy is a 1986 South Korean film directed by Nam Ki-nam.

Synopsis
A story about a botanist who falls into the clutches of a mysterious mountain family.

Cast
 Choi Myung-gil
 Lee Moo-jung 
 Kim Dong-hyeon 
 Park Dong-yong 
 Jin Bong-jin 
 Song Kyun-chul 
 Seong Mi-jin 
 Oh Young-hwa 
 You Gyeong-ae 
 Gil Dal-ho

References

External links 
 

1986 films
1980s Korean-language films
South Korean horror films